Buckland is an English surname. Notable people with the surname include:

Anne Walbank Buckland (1832–1899), English anthropologist, travel writer and author
Francis Trevelyan Buckland (1826–1880), English surgeon, zoologist and natural historian
Frank Buckland (ice hockey) (1902–1991), Canadian sports administrator
Frank Buckland (politician) (1847–1915), New Zealand MP
Herbert Tudor Buckland (1869–1951), British architect
James Buckland (born 1981), English rugby union player
Jessie Buckland (1878–1939), New Zealand photographer 
John Buckland (New Zealand politician) (1844–1909), New Zealand politician
Jonny Buckland (born 1977), British guitarist and musician of Coldplay
Kira Buckland (born 1987), American voice actress
Michael Buckland (born 1941), Emeritus Professor at the UC Berkeley School of Information
Raymond Buckland (born 1934), English American author
Robert Buckland (born 1968), British Conservative Party politician, MP politician and Lord Chancellor
Seymour Berry, 1st Baron Buckland (1877–1928), Welsh financier and industrialist
Stéphan Buckland (born 1977), Mauritian 200 m sprinter
Toby Buckland (born 1969), English gardener, TV presenter and author
William Buckland, D.D., F.R.S. (1784–1856), English theologian, geologist and palaeontologist
William Buckland (architect) (1734–1774), American architect
William Thomas Buckland (1798–1870), English surveyor and auctioneer
William Buckland (politician) (died 1876), New Zealand politician
William Warwick Buckland (1859–1946), Roman Law scholar
Yve Buckland (born 1956), British public health administrator

English-language surnames
English toponymic surnames